The 2004–05 Slovak 1.Liga season was the 12th season of the Slovak 1. Liga, the second level of ice hockey in Slovakia. 12 teams participated in the league, and HKm Detva (Zvolen B) won the championship.

Regular season

Playoffs

Quarterfinals

 MHC Martin – HC Dukla Senica  4:1  (4:2, 7:4, 1:3, 4:1, 5:2)
 HC VTJ Telvis Topoľčany – HK Spišská Nová Ves  4:0  (3:2sn, 4:1, 4:2, 6:5PP)
 PHK Prešov – HKm Detva (Zvolen B)  2:4  (2:3, 3:2, 2:3, 0:1, 7:2, 1:3)
 HK Trnava – MšHK Prievidza  0:4  (1:3, 2:3, 2:6, 1:3)

Semifinals

 MHC Martin – HKm Detva (Zvolen B)  0:4  (1:3, 3:5, 2:3, 1:2sn)
 HC VTJ Telvis Topoľčany – MšHK Prievidza  4:3  (2:4, 4:5sn, 5:3, 5:4, 2:4, 5:3, 3:1)

Final

 HC VTJ Telvis Topoľčany – HKm Detva (Zvolen B)  1:4  (5:3, 1:8, 1:9, 0:3, 1:3)

Relegation 
 ŠaHK Iskra Banská Bystrica – HKm Humenné 3:2 (1:4, 4:1, 3:2, 3:5, 5:4 sn)

External links
 Season on hockeyarchives.info

Slovak 1. Liga
Slovak 1. Liga seasons
Liga